Emily M. Bender is a professor of linguistics at the University of Washington, who specializes in computational linguistics and natural language processing. She is also the director of the University of Washington's Computational Linguistics Laboratory. She has published several papers on the risks of large language models.

Contributions
Bender has constructed the LinGO Grammar Matrix, an open-source starter kit for the development of broad-coverage precision HPSG grammars. In 2013, she published Linguistic Fundamentals for Natural Language Processing: 100 Essentials from Morphology and Syntax, and in 2019, she published Linguistic Fundamentals for Natural Language Processing II: 100 Essentials from Semantics and Pragmatics with Alex Lascarides, which both explain basic linguistic principles in a way that makes them accessible to NLP practitioners. 

Bender has published research papers on the linguistic structures of Japanese, Chintang, Mandarin, Wambaya, ASL and English. 

In 2020, Bender co-authored a paper with Google researcher Timnit Gebru and others that Google tried to block from publication, part of a sequence of events leading to Gebru departing from Google, the details of which are disputed. The paper concerned ethical issues in building natural language processing systems using machine learning from large text corpora. Since then, she has invested efforts to popularize AI ethics and has taken a stand against hype over large language models.

The Bender Rule is research advice for computational scholars to "always name the language you're working with".

Education and career
Bender received her PhD from Stanford University in 2000 for her research on syntactic variation and linguistic competence in African American Vernacular English (AAVE). Bender's AB in linguistics is from UC Berkeley and she also attended Tohoku University. Before working at University of Washington, Bender held positions at Stanford University, UC Berkeley and worked in industry at YY Technologies. She currently holds several positions at the University of Washington, where she has been faculty since 2003, including professor in the Department of Linguistics, adjunct professor in the Department of Computer Science and Engineering, faculty director of the Master of Science in Computational Linguistics, and director of the Computational Linguistics Laboratory. Bender is the current holder of the Howard and Frances Nostrand Endowed Professorship.

Bender was elected VP-elect of the Association for Computational Linguistics in 2021.  Bender will serve as VP-elect in 2022, moving to Vice-President in 2023, President in 2024, and Past President in 2025.

Key publications 
 (1999) Sag, Ivan, Thomas Wasow, and Emily M. Bender. Syntactic theory: A formal introduction. Center for the Study of Language and Information.
 (2000) Bender, Emily M. Syntactic variation and linguistic competence: The case of AAVE copula absence. Stanford University.
 (2000) Bender, Emily M. The syntax of Mandarin Bă: Reconsidering the verbal analysis. Journal of East Asian Linguistics.
(2002) Bender, Emily M., Dan Flickinger, and Stephan Oepen. The Grammar Matrix: An open-source starter-kit for the rapid development of cross-linguistically consistent broad-coverage precision grammars. Proceedings of the 2002 workshop on Grammar engineering and evaluation-Volume 15.
 (2002) Siegel, Melanie and Emily M. Bender. Efficient deep processing of Japanese. Proceedings of the 3rd workshop on Asian language resources and international standardization-Volume 12.
(2013) Bender, Emily M. Linguistic Fundamentals for Natural Language Processing: 100 Essentials from Morphology and Syntax. Synthesis Lectures on Human Language Technologies.     
(2014) Bender, Emily M., Fei Xia, Joshua Crowgey, and Michael Wayne Goodman. Xigt: Extensible interlinear glossed text for natural language processing. Springer Science+Business Media Dordrecht 2014    
(2016) Bender, Emily M., Fei Xia, Joshua Crowgey, and Michael Wayne Goodman, William D. Lewis , Glenn Slayden, Ryan Georgi Enriching A Massively Multilingual database of interlinear glossed text Springer Science+Business Media Dordrecht 2016 
 (2019) Bender, Emily M. and Alex Lascarides. Linguistic Fundamentals for Natural Language Processing II: 100 Essentials from Semantics and Pragmatics. Synthesis Lectures on Human Language Technologies.
 (2021) Bender, Emily M., Timnit Gebru, Angelina  McMillan-Major and Shmargaret  Shmitchell. On the Dangers of Stochastic Parrots: Can Language Models Be Too Big? 🦜. FAccT '21: Proceedings of the 2021 ACM Conference on Fairness, Accountability, and Transparency.

References

External links 
 Personal page at University of Washington
 Faculty page at University of Washington
Article by Emily Bender in The Linguist List's Famous Linguists series

Living people
Linguists from the United States
Women linguists
Scientists from Seattle
Stanford University alumni
University of Washington faculty
1973 births
20th-century linguists
21st-century linguists